Franz Xaver Glöggl (21 February 1764 – 16 June 1839) was an Austrian musician and musical entrepreneur. He was appointed Kapellmeister of the Cathedral of Linz in about 1797. He was an important figure in the cultural life of Linz. He corresponded with Haydn, Mozart and Georg Joseph Vogler, and was a friend of Beethoven.

Life 

Glöggl was born on 21 February 1764 in Linz, which at that time was in the Archduchy of Austria. He was the son of the Austrian musician, composer and conductor Johann Joseph Glöggl.

Between 1784 and 1786 he was in Vienna, where he studied violin under Anton Hofmann and trombone with Clemens Messerer. From 1787 he conducted the theatre orchestra of Linz, and in 1790 he took over his father's position as Turnermeister, director of the tower music of the city of Linz. He was appointed Kapellmeister of the Old Cathedral of Linz in 1797 or 1798. The violinist Karl Holz, who later played in the Schuppanzigh Quartet and became a friend and personal secretary to Beethoven, studied under Glöggl in Linz.

Glöggl was active as a theatrical producer in Linz and in Salzburg. He ran a shop which dealt in art and music items. Tobias Haslinger, who later became a friend of Beethoven and published much of his music, worked in the shop.

From 1812, Glöggl published a musical journal, the Musikalische Zeitung für die österreichischen Staaten.

When Beethoven visited Linz in the autumn of 1812, he visited and became friends with Glöggl. Beethoven asked if he could hear an equale, the characteristic funeral trombone music genre of Linz, and Glöggl arranged a performance at his house. Glöggl asked him for a six-part equale, to include the unusual soprano and quart trombones that he owned. Beethoven wrote for him the Drei Equale für vier posaunen (WoO 30), which are for alto, tenor and bass trombones and do not call for the soprano or quart instruments.

Glöggl's collection of musical instruments and manuscripts was acquired in 1824 by the Gesellschaft der Musikfreunde in Vienna, and formed the basis of what may be the oldest surviving institutional musical instrument collection, the Sammlung alter Musikinstrumente, which since 1938 has been held in trust by the Viennese Kunsthistorisches Museum.

Glöggl died in Linz on 16 June 1839.

References

Musicians from Linz
1764 births
1839 deaths
Austrian male musicians